Kidwelly Rugby Football Club is a rugby union club representing the town of Kidwelly, Carmarthenshire, South Wales. Rugby was first played in Kidwelly around 1880, though as is usual within early Welsh rugby history, no written evidence exists to give an exact year of formation. Kidwelly RFC are members of the Welsh Rugby Union and is a feeder club for the Llanelli Scarlets.

Between 1890 and 1891, a former Kidwelly RFC senior player, Stephen Thomas, represented Wales in three international games, though at the time of these matches he played for Llanelli RFC. Two other former Kidwelly players, Ray Gravell and Gerald Davies, represented Wales, though Gravelle had only played for the Kidwelly youth team.

Notable former players
  Gerald Davies (46 caps)
  Stephen Thomas (3 caps)

References

Welsh rugby union teams
Sport in Carmarthenshire